Ethiopia competed at the 2011 World Championships in Athletics from August 27 to September 4 in Daegu, South Korea.

Team selection

A provisional list of 36 athletes was
announced to represent the country
in the event. The participation of Kenenisa Bekele and Tirunesh Dibaba
is said to be uncertain.

The final team on the entry list comprises the names of 42 athletes.

The following athletes appeared on the preliminary Entry List, but not on the Official Start List of the specific event, resulting in total number of 34 competitors:

Medalists
The following competitors from Ethiopia won medals at the Championships

Results

Men

Ibrahim Jeilan won the gold medal in a dramatic sprint finish in the men's 10,000m final.

Women

References

External links
Official local organising committee website
Official IAAF competition website

Nations at the 2011 World Championships in Athletics
World Championships in Athletics
Ethiopia at the World Championships in Athletics